WGTC-LP (92.7 FM) is a radio station licensed to serve the community of Mayhew, Mississippi. The station is owned by East Mississippi Community College, and airs a top 40 format.

The station was assigned the WGTC-LP call letters by the Federal Communications Commission on December 30, 2014.

References

External links
 Official Website
 

GTC-LP
GTC-LP
GTC-LP
Radio stations established in 2015
2015 establishments in Mississippi
Contemporary hit radio stations in the United States
Lowndes County, Mississippi